Cantinflas Show is a Mexican animated television series produced by Televisa, Dimex and Producciones Carlos Amador. The series was created by Mario Moreno 'Cantinflas' and animated by Spanish animator José Luis Moro, who animated the pilot episode in 1972.

Cantinflas, the main character, is present in popular stories like Samson and Delilah, and meets famous geniuses like Albert Einstein and Thomas Edison. It can clearly be seen that the Mexican comedian improvised his script, which adds the comedy-relief, especially in his conversations with each episode's character.

The show was syndicated in the United States in two forms. The first, which aired as Amigo and Friends, dubbed the episodes in English. The second version used the original title, and distributed the episodes in both English and Spanish.

The show was dubbed into six languages, and was very successful in international distribution.

Episodes
The following list contains the episodes from the first season of Cantinflas Show.
1.-Acapulco
2.-Adopte un Árbol (Adopt a Tree)
3.-El Astronauta
4.-La Aviación
5.-El Boxeo
6.-Caruso
7.-Chopín
8.-La Ciudad de México
9.-Cleopatra
10.-Un Cuento de Hadas (A Fairy Tale)
11.-Dante
12.-Diógenes
13.-Édison
14.-Einstein
15.-El Agua (The Water)
16.-El Diluvio (Noah's Ark)
17.-El Petróleo (The Oil)
18.-El Rey Midas
19.-En el Japón (In Japan)
20.-Fausto
21.-Federico el Grande
22.-Francis Drake
23.-El Fútbol
24.-Galileo
25.-Goya
26.-Gulliver
27.-Gutenberg
28.-Hans Christian Andersen
29.-Helena de Troya
30.-La Comunicación
31.-La Carta (The Letter) - Featuring excerpts from El Salón México by Aaron Copland
32.-La Electricidad
33.-La Imagen
34.-La Roma de Nerón (Nero's Rome)
35.-La Vivienda (Housing)
36.-Las 7 Maravillas (Teotihuacán)
37.-Las Musas (The Muses)
38.-Leonardo da Vinci
39.-Linneo y Darwin
40.-Madrid
41.-Marco Polo
42.-El Museo Antropológico (The Anthropology Museum)
43.-Napoleón
44.-La Navidad (Christmas)
45.-Lo Oriental
46.-Pasteur
47.-Robinsón Crusoe
48.-Romeo y Julieta
49.-Sansón
50.-Superagente 777
51.-Los Toros (Bullfighting)
52.-Velázquez

Remake
In 1982, Hanna-Barbera produced a new version of the cartoon series, Cantinflas y Sus Amigos, titled in English-speaking countries as Amigo and Friends. Cantinflas himself reprised his role in Spanish, while Don Messick voiced the character in English, with Cantinflas' character renamed as "Amigo".

DVD release
In 2004, BCI, under a license from Rebel Crew Films Inc, released the shorts on DVD under the Cantinflas Show name; the DVD collection also included episodes of Amigo and Friends. Veracruz Media LLC retains all worldwide distribution rights for the Cantinflas Show and Amigo and Friends.

References

Mexican children's animated television series
1970s Mexican television series
1980s Mexican television series
1970s animated television series
1980s animated television series
1972 Mexican television series debuts
1982 Mexican television series endings